Government Medical College, Mahbubnagar also Mahbubnagar Medical College is a medical college located in Mahbubnagar, Telangana. It received permission from Medical Council of India in January 2016. The college is affiliated to Kaloji Narayana Rao University of Health Sciences.

History
The college was inaugurated in 2016. The MCI gave permission to 150 seats and started its first academic year in 2016–17.

Hospital
A 300-bed hospital facility is part of the medical college. A new college campus is also coming up. The college is spread over 50 acres.

See also 
Education in India
Literacy in India
List of institutions of higher education in Telangana
Medical Council of India

References

External links 
 

Educational institutions established in 2016
Medical colleges in Telangana
Mahbubnagar district
2016 establishments in Telangana